A triple concerto is a concerto for three solo instruments and orchestra.

This list of such concertos for piano trio (consisting of violin, cello and piano) and orchestra is ordered alphabetically by composer surname.

A
 Kalevi Aho
 Triple Concerto for violin, cello, piano and orchestra (2018)
 Fikret Amirov
 To the Memory of Ghadsibekov, poem for violin, cello, piano and orchestra (1949)
 Lera Auerbach
Serenade for a Melancholic Sea for violin, cello, piano and string orchestra, Op. 68 (2002) (dedicated to Gidon Kremer)

B
Henk Badings
Concertino (1942)
Ludwig van Beethoven
Concerto for Violin, Cello, and Piano in C major, Op. 56 (1804)
Wilhelm Georg Berger (1929–1993)
Concerto for Violin, Cello, Piano and Orchestra, Op. 64 (1984)

C
Alfredo Casella
 Triple Concerto, Op. 56 (1933)
Paul Constantinescu
Triplu concert (1963)

F
Lorenzo Ferrero
 Concerto for Violin, Cello, Piano and Orchestra (1995)
Benjamin Frankel
Serenata Concertante for piano trio and orchestra, one movement (in parts), Op. 37 (1960)

G
Giorgio Federico Ghedini
Concerto dell´Albatro (The albatross concerto) for violin, cello, piano, and orchestra (with narrator) (1945)

H
Daron Hagen
Orpheus and Eurydice for violin, cello, piano and orchestra (2006)
Bernhard Heiden
Triple concerto (1957)
Alun Hoddinott
Triple concerto, Op. 124 (1986)
Vagn Holmboe
Concerto for violin, cello, piano and chamber orchestra (once called Chamber Concerto No. 4) M.139 (1942)

J
Paul Juon
Concerto (Episodes concertantes) for violin, cello, and piano with orchestra [D minor], Op. 45 (1911)

M
Gian Francesco Malipiero
Concerto a tre (1938)
Bohuslav Martinů
Concertino with string orchestra, H.232 (1933)
Concert, H.231 (1933)
Emánuel Moór
Triple Concerto, Op. 70
Nico Muhly
Triple Concerto for violin, cello, piano and string orchestra (2010)

P
Jordan Pal
 Triple Concerto for Violin, Cello, Piano and Orchestra "Starling" (2013)

R
 Marga Richter
Variations and Interludes on Themes from Monteverdi and Bach for violin, cello, piano and orchestra (1992)
 Jeffrey Ryan
 Equilateral: Triple Concerto for Piano Trio and Orchestra (2007)
 Wolfgang Rihm
 Trio Concerto for violin, violoncello, piano and orchestra (2014)

S
 Felipe Senna
Danzas No.2 - triple concerto for Violin, Cello, Piano and Orchestra (2016)

T
Alexander Tcherepnin
Triple Concerto, Op. 47 (1931)
Triple Concerto, Op.47-bis (1967)

V
Kevin Volans
Trio Concerto (2005)
Jan Václav Voříšek
Grand Rondeau concertant, Op.25 (1825)

W
Wolfram Wagner
Concerto for Violin, Cello, Piano and Orchestra (1997)
Robert Ward
Dialogues (1986, also arranged for piano trio)
Stanley Weiner
Triple concerto, Op. 71

Z
Ellen Taaffe Zwilich
Triple concerto for violin, cello and piano and Orchestra (1995)

See also

List of compositions for violin and orchestra
List of compositions for cello and orchestra
List of compositions for piano and orchestra
Piano trio repertoire
 String instrument repertoire
 List of solo cello pieces
 List of compositions for cello and piano
 List of double concertos for violin and cello

References

External links
Triple concerto on the page of Daron Hagen
Altenberg Piano Trio Repertoire Page

 
Triple concertos